Frainc-Comtou is a Romance language of the langues d'oïl language family spoken in the Franche-Comté region of France and in the Canton of Jura and Bernese Jura in Switzerland.

Sample vocabulary

References

Bibliography
 Dalby, David (1999/2000). The Linguasphere Register of the World's Languages and Speech Communities. (Vol. 2). Hebron, Wales, UK: Linguasphere Press. .

See also
 Languages of France
 Languages of Switzerland
 Linguasphere Observatory (Observatoire Linguistique)

External links
 Franc-Comtois dictionary and external links to materials about the language

Oïl languages
Languages of France
Culture of Franche-Comté